"Samson and Delilah" is a traditional song based on the Biblical tale of Samson and his betrayal by Delilah. Its best known performer is perhaps the Grateful Dead, who first performed the song live in 1976, with guitarist Bob Weir singing lead vocals. It was frequently played live by the Dead. The 1977 album  Terrapin Station featured a studio recording of the song.

Although Weir learned the song from Reverend Gary Davis, several earlier versions had been recorded under various titles, including "If I Had My Way I'd Tear the Building Down"/"Oh Lord If I Had My Way" by Blind Willie Johnson in 1927. The song has since been performed by a wide variety of artists ranging from Dave van Ronk, Bob Dylan, Charlie Parr, Dave Van Ronk, The Staple Singers, Ike and Tina Turner, Clara Ward, Dorothy Love Coates & The Gospel Harmonettes, to Peter, Paul and Mary, The Washington Squares, The Blasters, Willie Watson, Elizabeth Cook, Robert Randolph and the Family Band, and Bruce Springsteen and the Seeger Sessions Band (in Verona, Italy 2006). Garbage frontwoman Shirley Manson's version appeared in the second season premiere episode (also titled "Samson and Delilah") of the Fox television show Terminator: The Sarah Connor Chronicles, in which Manson was also a main cast member. Art Greenhaw recorded a version with The Jordanaires and Larry "T-Byrd" Gordon, which was released in 2005.

Guest star Simon Oakland sings the song with the drovers around a campfire in the Rawhide episode "Incident of the Travellin' Man", aired in season six on October 17, 1963.

Song appeared on the Sir Tom Jones' album Surrounded By Time in 2021.

References

Blind Willie Johnson songs
Peter, Paul and Mary songs
Gospel songs
Grateful Dead songs
Songs based on the Bible
Samson
Tina Turner songs